Tara Jarmon is a Paris-based Canadian fashion designer. Born in Canada, she moved to Newport Beach, California in high school. Jarmon launched her self-titled clothing line over 30 years ago, which now spans more than 23 free-standing Tara Jarmon boutiques and 80 store-in-store locations throughout Europe and Asia. Jarmon attended The University of Southern California, but graduated from The American University of Paris. She resides in Paris.
In May 2006, Jarmon designed a collection of affordable women's apparel and accessories for Target Corporation's Go International line.

Following the sale of her namesake brand to AMS industries in 2016, she decided to launch in 2018 a new brand named Mirae with her daughter Camille.

References

External links
Tara Jarmon official website
Tara Jarmon in the Fashion Model Directory
Mirae official website
Tara Jarmon Lebanon Website

Year of birth missing (living people)
Living people
American fashion designers
American women fashion designers
Jewish fashion designers
Canadian Jews
Canadian emigrants to the United States
American expatriates in France
University of Southern California alumni
American University of Paris alumni
Canadian fashion designers
Canadian women fashion designers
21st-century American women